Giorgio Bianchi (18 February 1904 – 9 February 1967) was an Italian film director and actor.

Selected filmography
 Mother Earth (1931)
 Resurrection (1931)
 The Charmer (1931)
 Before the Jury (1931)
 The Blue Fleet (1932)
 Two Happy Hearts (1932)
 Five to Nil (1932)
 Venus (1932)
 Saint John, the Beheaded (1940)
 A Little Wife (1943)
 Crime News (1947)
 Twenty Years (1949)
 Hearts at Sea (1950)
 Porca miseria (1951)
 Il caimano del Piave (1951)
 Amor non ho... però... però (1951)
 The Enemy (1952)
 The Shadow (1954)
 Io piaccio (1955)
 Buonanotte... avvocato! (1955)
 Count Max (1957)
 Vacations in Majorca (1959)
 The Moralist (1959)
 Le olimpiadi dei mariti (1960)
 Femmine di lusso (1960)
 The Orderly (1961)
 Il mio amico Benito (1962)
 Toto and Peppino Divided in Berlin (1962)
 The Changing of the Guard (1962)
 I 4 tassisti (1963)
 L'immorale (1967)

External links

1904 births
1967 deaths
20th-century Italian male actors
Italian film directors
Male actors from Rome